Mortimer & Whitehouse: Gone Fishing is a factual entertainment television show featuring friends Bob Mortimer and Paul Whitehouse, both comedians. The show features Mortimer and Whitehouse reflecting on life after their shared major heart problems, while on a fishing trip to various locations around Britain. The series was first broadcast on BBC Two in 2018 and has been recommissioned every year since. An hour-long Christmas special was added from 2020 onwards
The fifth series started on 9 September 2022. In 2023 a further two series were announced; the six episodes of series 6 will air in 2023 with series 7 being expanded to 8 episodes in 2024.

Background
The show's origins lie in Mortimer's triple heart bypass surgery and Whitehouse, like Mortimer, having had heart problems that were only detected at the last minute. Whitehouse was talking to Mortimer's wife, Lisa about Bob's recovery from the operation; he discovered that Mortimer wasn't going out anymore and so Whitehouse invited him to go fishing with him. Mortimer enjoyed it; describing it later, he said "I’ve never felt anything like it." "There comes a moment when you realise that you’ve said nothing for an hour and a half. I haven’t thought about anything else. I haven’t worried about the past, or future." It wasn't until a later date that Mortimer discovered it had all been a "ruse to get me back into life" that Whitehouse had been conspiring with Lisa. The fishing trips worked and brought Mortimer out of his trough, and then Whitehouse had the idea for the show. They thought there might be the chance to make a humorous and informative programme that was beyond "two old blokes going fishing". Whitehouse described the pitch for the show as combining the real-life jeopardy of their medical conditions, two old friends who had had a reprieve, and the timeless wonder of the English countryside.

Episodes

 Averages exclude Christmas episodes.

Series 1 (2018)

Series 2 (2019)

Series 3 (2020)

 The Christmas episode had a one hour running time, instead of the usual 30 minutes.

Series 4 (2021)

 The Christmas episode had a one hour running time, instead of the usual 30 minutes. The pair are joined by footballer Paul Gascoigne, and musical act Paul Heaton and Jacqui Abbott. Mortimer catches his first salmon.

Series 5 (2022)

 The Christmas episode had a one hour running time, instead of the usual 30 minutes.

Reception
The series has received widespread praise for its warmth, charm, gentle nature and poignancy. Sam Wollaston in The Guardian praised it for its genuine reality and described it as "lovely: warm and funny and human and healthy." In The Herald, Alison Rowat described it as "Soothing, funny and poignant", going on to say that it is essential viewing "in a 'break glass in case of emergency' kind of way". Guy Pewsy in the Evening Standard wrote that the show had a "sense of real affection and solidarity", partly down to Mortimer and Whitehouse's shared sense of humour and affectionate rapport. Summing up he called it "a warm and thoroughly pleasant half an hour". iNews reviewer Elisa Bray, praised the show's "natural" feel and said that it was "A breath of fresh air", calling it "one of the most therapeutic and relaxing on television."

In a five-star review of the second series in The Guardian, Jack Seale praised Mortimer and Whitehouse's comedic chemistry and the series' production values ("It’s just a couple of blokes dicking about but it's filmed in glistening, often airborne HD"), and concluded that "Gone Fishing is a reminder that there's nothing better to spend your money on than friends, memories and moments of throwaway pleasure."

In a review of the first episode of series three, The Independents Ed Cumming commented on the show's continued and perhaps unexpected popularity, stating that "it’s hard to explain the curious alchemy of Gone Fishing, which is rarely laugh-out-loud funny but has a soothing, unforced pace that draws you in. The production helps, using plenty of drone shots to show the country’s rivers in stately majesty, but the programme relies on the performances of its leads, two of our most gifted comic performers".

A tie-in book for the series, Mortimer & Whitehouse: Gone Fishing: Life, Death and the Thrill of the Catch, was published by Bonnier Books in 2019. An audiobook version, read by Mortimer and Whitehouse, described by The Guardian as "one of the best audio books of 2019," followed.

References

External links
 
 
 

2020s British television series
2018 British television series debuts
BBC Television shows
English-language television shows
Fishing television series